The UAE Healthy Kidney 10K was an annual road running event over 10 kilometers (6.2 miles) that took place in May in New York City in the United States. The event featured both an elite-level men's race and a general mass race for fun runners. Almost 8000 runners took part in the event each year. Its course is situated entirely within Manhattan's Central Park. It was one of two major annual 10K races held at the venue by the New York Road Runners Club, alongside the women-only New York Mini 10K.

The event was launched in May 2005 by New York Road Runners with the sponsorship of the Embassy of the United Arab Emirates. Zayed bin Sultan Al Nahyan, a former president of the country, received treatment and a kidney transplant at the Cleveland Clinic in 2000. He lived until November 2004 and the event was created in his honor soon after, with proceeds from the race going towards the National Kidney Foundation.

The course for the race was a single-looped circuit on the paths and roads within the park, comprising a little over one full lap of the park in a clockwise direction. Runners started in the south-west corner of Central Park, heading north past Sheep Meadow and The Ramble and Lake via West Park Drive. It looped southwards past Harlem Meer at the 5 km (3-mile) mark and went south on East Park Drive, passing the Reservoir and Great Lawn and Turtle Pond. The course reached the 5-mile mark just before Central Park's Bandshell. Runners turned back north after Wollman Rink, reached the 6-mile mark at the start line, then crossed the finish line near the Tavern on the Green.

The first two editions of the men's race were won by Craig Mottram. Dathan Ritzenhein became the first American to win the race and Patrick Makau became the first African the year after. Ethiopians Tadese Tola and Gebre Gebremariam ran course records under 28 minutes to win in 2009 and 2010. Phoenix Kipruto of Kenia set the course record at 27:08 minutes in 2018, the fastest record eligible 10k ever run on US soil. The event does not actively invite an elite women's field, due to the proximity of June's New York Mini 10K women's race, but elite level female athletes who are resident in the area typically take part. Ethiopia's Senbere Teferi holds the women's course record of 30:59 minutes, set in 2019.

The 2020 edition of the race was cancelled due to the COVID-19 pandemic. It was not held in 2021 either. In 2021, the NYRR were in a crisis due to COVID-19 related revenue drops, layoffs and accusations against senior management. After changes in management, NYRR planned to cull races if sponsor do not align with the organization's values. It decided in fall 2021 not to hold the UAE Healthy Kidney 10K in 2022, which may be related to the UAE's human rights record.

The event has not returned since. NYRR introduced the NYRR Manhattan 10K in 2022, which also takes place in Central Park, but in February. Other races by NYRR held in Central Park are the NYRR Joe Kleinerman 10K in January and Grete's Great Gallop, a 10-kilometer race in August commemorating Grete Waitz.

Past winners

Key:

Race finishers

References

List of winners
Healthy Kidney 10 km. Association of Road Racing Statisticians (2011-05-23). Retrieved on 2012-05-19.

External links
Official website at New York Road Runners
Searchable results, including all finisher counts, at New York Road Runners

10K runs
Road running competitions in the United States
Recurring sporting events established in 2005
Sports competitions in New York City
Tourist attractions in Manhattan
Central Park
Annual sporting events in the United States
United Arab Emirates–United States relations